Dentons Global Advisors ASG, formerly Albright Stonebridge Group, is a global business strategy firm based in Washington, D.C., United States. It was created in 2009 through the merger of international consulting firms The Albright Group, founded in 2001 by former U.S. Secretary of State Madeleine Albright, and Stonebridge International. It is a founding member of Dentons Global Advisors.

The firm advises clients on international policy and global markets. Its Senior Counselors include Joschka Fischer, James B. Steinberg, Pär Nuder, Carla A. Hills, and Thomas R. Pickering.

Several firm alumni joined the presidential administration of Joe Biden in 2021. The high concentration of officials entering from ASG and a relatively small number of similar firms worried some progressives over possible corporate influence on the administration.

References

External links
 

Privately held companies based in Washington, D.C.
Madeleine Albright
Lobbying firms based in Washington, D.C.